In mathematics, a Picard modular surface, studied by , is a complex surface constructed as a quotient of the unit ball in C2 by a Picard modular group.
Picard modular surfaces are some of the simplest examples of Shimura varieties and are sometimes used as a test case for the general theory of Shimura varieties.

See also

Hilbert modular surface
Siegel modular variety

References

Complex surfaces
Algebraic surfaces
Automorphic forms
Langlands program